Commonwealth Glacier is a glacier which flows in a southeasterly direction and enters the northern side of Taylor Valley immediately west of Mount Coleman, in Victoria Land, Antarctica. It was charted by the British Antarctic Expedition, 1910–13 (BrAE ), under Robert Falcon Scott, and named by them for the Commonwealth of Australia, which made a financial grant to the BrAE and contributed two members to the Western Geological Party which explored this area. The north end of the glacier is bounded by Flint Ridge.

See also
 List of glaciers in the Antarctic
 Glaciology

Further reading
 Steven A. ARCONE, Karl KREUTZ, GPR reflection profiles of Clark and Commonwealth Glaciers, Dry Valleys, Antarctica , Climate Change Institute, University of Maine, Orono, ME 04469, USA
 Gayle L. Dana, Robert A. Wharton, Jr, Andrew G. Fountain, McMurdo Dry Valleys LTER: Solar radiation on glaciers in Taylor Valley, Antarctica

References
 

Glaciers of the Asgard Range
Glaciers of McMurdo Dry Valleys